Mount Fairweather is a prominent mountain,  high, standing at the head of Somero Glacier,  north-east of Mount Schevill, in the Queen Maud Mountains of Antarctica. It was so named by the Southern Party of the New Zealand Geological Survey Antarctic Expedition (1963–64), which experienced a spell of unusually fine weather while in the vicinity of this peak.

See also
Mount Corbató

References

Queen Maud Mountains
Amundsen Coast